Shanlinxi Forest Recreation Area or Sun Link Sea Forest Recreation Area is a forest in Zhushan Township, Nantou County, Taiwan.

Geography
The forest is located at an elevation of 1,600-1,800 meters above sea level with an area of 40 hectares. It consists of herb and flower garden as well as three waterfalls, namely Qingyun Waterfall, Niaosong Waterfall and Water Curtain Cave Waterfall.

Facilities
The forest features campsites and wooden cottages.

Transportation
The forest is accessible by bus from Taichung Station of Taiwan Railways.

See also
 Geography of Taiwan

References

Forests of Taiwan
Geography of Nantou County
Tourist attractions in Nantou County
Campsites in Taiwan